Krugloye is a rural locality (a selo) and the administrative center of Kruglyanskoye Rural Settlement, Kashirsky District, Voronezh Oblast, Russia. The population was 826 as of 2010. There are 13 streets.

Geography 
Krugloye is located 32 km southwest of Kashirskoye (the district's administrative centre) by road. Levaya Rossosh is the nearest rural locality.

References 

Rural localities in Kashirsky District, Voronezh Oblast